Alexander Peya and Bruno Soares were the defending champions, but chose not to participate this year.
Eric Butorac and Raven Klaasen won the title, defeating Pablo Cuevas and Horacio Zeballos in the final, 6–2, 6–4.

Seeds

Draw

Draw

References
 Main Draw

Proton Malaysian Open - Doubles
2013 Doubles